Paddy Harrington (1933 – July 2005) was an Irish sportsman. He played Gaelic football with his local club Ardgroom in Cork and Garda in Dublin and was a member of the Cork senior inter-county team in the 1950s and 1960s. His son, Pádraig Harrington is a professional golfer and has won three major championships.

References

1933 births
2005 deaths
Ardgroom Gaelic footballers
Beara Gaelic footballers
Cork inter-county Gaelic footballers
Munster inter-provincial Gaelic footballers
Garda Gaelic footballers